Aousserd is a province in the Moroccan economic region of Dakhla-Oued Ed-Dahab, and the disputed territory of Western Sahara. At the 2004 Census it had a population of 7,689.

Subdivisions
The prefecture is divided administratively into the following:

References

 
Aousserd Province